Quetta was a first-class cricket team based in Quetta, Balochistan, Pakistan.  Quetta participated in the Quaid-i-Azam Trophy. For Twenty20 and List A cricket they were known as the Quetta Bears and participated in the Faysal Bank T20 Cup and National One-day Championship .

Quetta played their first first-class matches in the Quaid-i-Azam Trophy in 1957–58. They reached the quarter-finals in 1962–63 and 1963–64, and continued playing in the Quaid-i-Azam Trophy until 1969–70. They also took part in first-class matches between 1962–63 and 1986–87 for the Ayub Trophy, the BCCP Trophy, the BCCP Patron's Trophy, and the BCCP President's Cup.

Quetta played no first-class matches between January 1987 and February 2004, when they once again began to take part in the Quaid-i-Azam Trophy.

Quetta have usually been one of the weaker teams in Pakistan cricket. As of February 2014 they had played 135 first-class matches for 20 wins, 78 losses and 37 draws.

Their home ground is Bugti Stadium (formerly known as the Racecourse Ground) in Quetta. They have not played any home games since the 2007–08 season.

References

External links
 Quetta at CricketArchive

Pakistani first-class cricket teams
Quetta
Cricket in Balochistan, Pakistan